Liam Anthony Hogan (born 8 February 1989) is an English professional footballer who plays as a centre-back for  club Oldham Athletic.

Career

Woodley Sports
Hogan started his career at Greater Manchester club Woodley Sports (afterwards known as Stockport Sports) in 2007, remaining in the club's youth setup for three years.

FC Halifax Town
On 1 July 2010, Hogan left Woodley and signed with FC Halifax Town. In his time at the Shaymen he played 109 league games, scoring three times. His first goal came against Nantwich Town with his second coming a week and a half later at Retford United, a game that saw the Shaymen crowned champions of the Northern Premier League Premier Division. His third goal came against Eastwood Town on 18 February 2012.

Fleetwood Town
On 22 May 2013, Hogan announced he was joining Lancashire club Fleetwood Town on a free transfer after his contract with F.C. Halifax ran out. He made his professional debut on 3 August, in a 3–1 home win against Dagenham & Redbridge.

Macclesfield Town (loan)
On 3 November 2014, Hogan was loaned to Conference Premier side Macclesfield Town until 9 December. On 11 December, his loan was extended until 10 January.

Tranmere Rovers
In May 2015 he joined Tranmere Rovers after his release by Fleetwood.

Gateshead
On 17 May 2016, Hogan signed for National League club Gateshead on a free transfer. On 30 July 2016, Hogan scored his first goal for the club in a 3–2 preseason victory at home to Boston United which won Gateshead the game. Hogan became club captain ahead of the 2016–17 season, making his competitive debut on 6 August 2016, as Gateshead beat Chester 3–0 in the first game of the season.

Salford City
In May 2017 he joined Salford City. At the end of the 2017–18 season he was named Player's Player of the Year by his fellow Salford players. During his time with the club he captained them to two promotions, the second of them securing the club's first promotion to the Football League, played 105 games and scored seven goals.

Stockport County
In February 2020 he moved to Stockport County, signing a two and a half year contract. He scored his first goal for the club on his debut.

Oldham Athletic
Hogan signed for newly relegated National League club Oldham Athletic on 1 June 2022 on a two-year contract.

Personal life
Hogan was born in Salford, England, and is of Irish descent – he and his brother have two Irish grandparents. His younger brother is Irish international footballer Scott and they played together at Salford City College.

Career statistics

Honours
FC Halifax Town
Northern Premier League Premier Division: 2010–11
National League North play-offs: 2013

Salford City
National League play-offs: 2019

Stockport County
National League: 2021–22

Individual
Salford City Player's Player of the Year: 2017–18
National League Team of the Year: 2020–21

References

External links

1989 births
Living people
Footballers from Salford
English footballers
Association football defenders
FC Halifax Town players
Fleetwood Town F.C. players
Macclesfield Town F.C. players
Tranmere Rovers F.C. players
Gateshead F.C. players
Salford City F.C. players
Stockport County F.C. players
Oldham Athletic A.F.C. players
Northern Premier League players
National League (English football) players
English Football League players
English people of Irish descent